Atchison USD 409 is a public unified school district headquartered in Atchison, Kansas, United States.

History
In 2021, the school board decided to change from Native American themed mascots for the sports teams at their high school and middle school.

Schools
The school district operates the following schools:
 Atchison High School
 Atchison Middle School
 Atchison Elementary School
 Central School

See also
 Kansas State Department of Education
 Kansas State High School Activities Association
 List of high schools in Kansas
 List of unified school districts in Kansas

References

External links
 

School districts in Kansas